Chor Sipahee is a 1977 Bollywood drama film directed by Prayag Raj. Shashi Kapoor, Vinod Khanna, Shabana Azmi and Parveen Babi played the lead roles in the film.

Writing Credits (in alphabetical order)

Plot
Reformist Bombay Police Inspector Shankar Kumar would like to try a new approach to tackle crime - make new leaves of criminals by making them change their ways. He tries this on Raja Khanna alias Raja Dada, but in vain. When he becomes acquainted with his family, which consists of unmarried sister, Bharti, and an elderly and ailing mother, he decides that he must do something more to help Raja. Before he could think of anything, Raja is arrested for the murder of a police informer named Bichoo. Shankar destroys the evidence that links Raja to this murder, thus losing his job, facing criminal charges himself, and getting a jail sentence. When he comes out of jail, it is no longer the same Shankar - but one who is ready to join Raja as his criminal partner. But Raja is not the same petty criminal anymore - he has joined forces with international gangs of smugglers and may not quite be receptive to Shankar's request to join his gang. Shankar will now have to prove himself worthy of joining this.

Cast
Shashi Kapoor as Inspector Shankar Kumar / Bada Sahib 
Vinod Khanna as Raja Khanna / Raja Dada 
Parveen Babi as Bharti Khanna 
Shabana Azmi as Priya 
Durga Khote as Mrs. Khanna (Raja & Bharati's mother)
Krishan Dhawan as Priya's father 
Asrani as Doctor 
Bhagwan as Rahim 
Kader Khan as Munshilal (BMC Worker) 
Ranjeet as Shaikh Jamal 
Om Shivpuri as Police Commissioner
Mac Mohan as Bichoo    
Narendra Nath as Inspector Apte 
Leena Das as Jamal's wife

Soundtrack

References

External links
 

1977 films
1970s Hindi-language films
Films scored by Laxmikant–Pyarelal
Indian drama films